University of Cape Town Football Club, also known as UCT FC, is the football club representing the University of Cape Town based in Cape Town, South Africa.

The University of Cape Town Football Club boasts 250 student members with four men's teams and two women's teams.

The Men's & Women's First Teams represent the university in the University Sports South Africa (USSA) Football National Club Championships competing with the top 20 university teams in the country, held in December of each year.

The USSA Football National Club Championships act as the qualifiers to the prestigious Varsity Sports Football tournament of the following year; with the top eight men's and women's teams affiliated with Varsity Sports booking their place in the tournament.

The club is an affiliate member of the Cape Town Tygerberg Football Association (CTTFA), with Men's First & Second Teams playing in the 2nd Division having recently joined the association in 2016. The Women's First Team plays in the Sasol Women's League, after being crowned SAFA Cape Town Regional Women's League champions in 2017 and winning promotion playoffs. Whilst the Women's Second Team plays in the CTTFA Ladies' League. The Men's Third & Fourth Teams play in the university's Internal Soccer League, boasting 50 teams, all students of UCT.

Crests & Colours
The club plays with the University of Cape Town Coat of Arms on the left breast of the playing jersey and the UCT Sport logo on the right. The UCT crest was designed in 1859 by Charles Davidson Bell, Surveyor-General of the Cape Colony at the time. Bell was an accomplished artist who also designed medals and the triangular Cape stamp.

UCT FC uses the UCT Sport colour palette, with three primary colours: navy blue, sky blue and white. The home kit is traditionally navy blue, while the away strip is predominantly white with sky blue detailing.

Nickname
The nickname "Ikey Warriors" was coined by 2014 Head Coach Rowan Hendricks and Ikey Tigers coach Kevin Musikanth during the 2014 Varsity Football season, due to the team's tenacious warrior-like spirit, tough tackling and never-say-die attitude. It was a nickname used only within the squad, but the media caught onto the name during the tournament, with Soccer Laduma among others writing about UCT's "Ikey Warriors". The name became popular among the club and its fans and has since grown into the club's official nickname.

For the first time, in 2015, the Ikey Warriors emblem was placed on the back of the playing jersey below the collar.

Stadium

UCT's home ground is the Kopano Astroturf, located on UCT's Lower Campus in Rosebank, Cape Town. The stadium can hold up to 500 spectators at capacity. The astroturf is FIFA approved, and was put on standby as a training facility during the 2010 FIFA World Cup due to its ability to withstand wet weather conditions. The astroturf was resurfed in July 2018.

The University of Cape Town were host to the 2018 Western Cape Intervarsity Tournament. Kopano Astroturf was used for the football fixtures held on Saturday, 28 September, UCT competing with The University of the Western Cape and Stellenbosch University (Maties).

Clubs such as Hellenic and ASD Cape Town have used the Kopano Astroturf as their home ground in the ABC Motsepe League in the past.

During the 2013 and 2014 Varsity Football tournaments, UCT played their home games on the Groote Schuur Rugby Field, due to its ability to hold a larger number of spectators.

Honours & Tournament History

Varsity Football record

Men 
2014 Varsity Football – 8th
2013 Varsity Football – 8th

Women
2017 Varsity Football – Semi-finalists 4th 
2016 Varsity Football – Semi-finalists 4th

USSA Football National Club Championships record

Men
2018 – Finished 3rd in group stages
2017 – 12th
2016 – 13th 
2015 – Tournament cancelled due to #FeesMustFall protests
2014 – Did Not Qualify 
2013 – 6th 
2012 – 9th 
2011 – Did Not Qualify 
2010 – Did Not Qualify 
2009 – Did Not Qualify

Women
2018 – Section B Winners 
2017 – Relegated from Section A
2016 – 8th 
2015 – Tournament cancelled due to #FeesMustFall protests
2014 – 13th 
2013 – 16th 
2012 – 15th 
2011 – 12th 
2010 – Did Not Qualify 
2009 – 8th

USSA First Team squad 2018

Women's Squad

Men's Squad

Club officials

Coaching Staff

Men's Technical Team
Head Coach:  Jaydon Terblanche
Assistant Coach & 2nd Team Coach:  Angelo Julius
Goalkeeper Coach:  Mark Kapman
Men's 3rd Team Coach:  Storm Johnson
Men's 4th Team Coach:  Lindokuhle Skosana and Keenen Christon

Women's Technical Team
Head Coach:  Kamaal Sait
Assistant Coach & 2nd Team Coach:  Ahmed Parker
Goalkeeper Coach:  Mark Kapman

Committee
Chairperson: Storm Johnson
Vice-Chairperson: Lwazi Ncanana
Secretary General: 
Treasurer: 
League Coordinator: Nadeem August
Kit & Equipment Manager: Nhlamuselo Ngoveni
Marketing Managers: Lindokuhle Skosana and Kawthar Gierdien
Events Manager: Vincent Mofokeng
Transformation and Outreach: Kateko Boitumelo Pule

Kit manufacturer
Kit manufacturer: Laurus

Former Coaches & Chairpersons

Former Head Coaches
 Cayl Coetsee – 2016 (interim)
 Vorgen Less – 2015-2016
 Rowan Hendricks – 2014
 Monwabisi Ralarala – 2012-2013
 Liam Shirley – 2012

Former Chairpersons
 Kateko Boitumelo Pule;– 2017 
 Ammar Canani;– 2017
 Warren Black;– 2016
 Daniel Perling – 2014-2016
 Fairouz West – 2013
 Dustin Holohan – 2011-2013

References

External links
 
 Varsity Sports Football
 University Sports South Africa Football
 South African Football Association

University of Cape Town
University and college soccer clubs in South Africa
Soccer clubs in Cape Town